Radien-attje, Jubmel, Waralden Olmai, Maylmen Olmai, Vearalden Olmai or Waralden Olmai is the superior or celestial deity of the Sami. He is also called Jubmel or Ibmel, a parallel to the Finnish Jumala (god).

The superior deity is the ruler of the Cosmos. In his honour, the Sami erect a sacrificial pole every autumn, symbolizing the world-pillar, which is considered as a connection the World to the firmament.  The pillar reached from the centre of the Earth to the fix point on the firmament - the Pole star. The superior deity is also the “giver of life” and is considered the god of fertility.

Radien-attje is often portrayed as the main figure in a Trinity, which besides him, consists of the Raedieahkka or Radien-akka (the superior mother) and their son Radien-pardne.  There are critics who claim, that this Trinity is a consequence of the meeting with the Christian religion, and that it is a match to God the Father, Jesus the Son and the Holy Spirit. If this is the case, the Sami have replaced the Holy Spirit with a wife. In some versions, the heavenly family also include the daughter Rana Niejta. As superior deity, Radien-attje is more of an intellectual superior, as his son, Radien-pardne, performs the practical things.

Waralden Olmai is also cognate with an epithet for the Germanic god Freyr.

Sources
 Sphinx-Suche (in German) - retrieved January 16, 2006 .

References 

Sámi gods